The Chaoma Sports Center is a sport center in Xitun District, Taichung, Taiwan.

History
The construction of the sport center began in August 2014 and completed in April 2016. On 7 December 2016, Taichung Mayor Lin Chia-lung inspected the venue hoping that the venue would provide a training center for professional athletes and develop Taichung residents sporting habit. The sport center underwent trial opening on 20-26 December 2016 and was officially opened to the public on 30 December 2016.

Architecture
 Badminton court
 Swimming pool

See also
 Sports in Taiwan

References

External links
  

2016 establishments in Taiwan
Buildings and structures in Taichung
Indoor arenas in Taiwan
Sports venues completed in 2016
Sports venues in Taiwan
Taichung's 7th Redevelopment Zone